The 2015 ACC Men's Lacrosse Championship took place April 24–26 at PPL Park in Chester, Pennsylvania.  The winner of the tournament received the Atlantic Coast Conference's automatic bid to the 2015 NCAA Division I Men's Lacrosse Championship. Four teams from the ACC competed in the single elimination competition. The seeds were based upon the teams' regular season conference record.

Standings
Only the top four teams in the ACC conference advanced to the Atlantic Coast Conference Tournament.

Schedule

References

http://www.theacc.com/page/championship_m-lacros Retrieved 2015-04-25.

http://raycomsports.com/sports_labs_docs/m-lacros/2015_mlax_bracket.pdf Retrieved 2015-04-25.

https://archive.today/20150426014356/http://laxmagazine.com/college_men/DI/standings/index Retrieved 2015-04-25.

ACC Tournament
ACC Men's Lacrosse
Atlantic Coast Conference men's lacrosse